A dele or deleatur is an obelism (a proofreading symbol) used to mark something for deletion.

Name
Dele, the more common term in modern American English (sometimes used as a verb, e.g. "Dele that graf"), coincides with the imperative form of the Latin delere ("to delete"). However, the Oxford English Dictionary notes an earlier use in English of deleatur (Latin "let it be deleted"), and suggests that dele in English may have been an abbreviation for the longer word.

Origin
The origin of the symbol appears to be an archaic letter D in the Kurrent script, as an abbreviation for dele or deleatur. It is markedly similar (if not identical in some cases) to the symbol for the German penny which is an archaic lowercase d, for denarius. As with most hand-written letters and symbols, its appearance is variable.

Usage
The dele is used in proofreading and copy editing, where it may be written over the selected text itself (such that it often resembles a stretched cursive e), or in the margin alongside the selected text, which is usually struck through with a line.

The stricken text or the dele itself may be framed by top and bottom curved brackets, as in the above example, to indicate that the space left after deletion is to be closed up.  As the need for such closing up can usually be inferred by context, however, the brackets are often omitted.

A dele can be undone with a stet.

The Unicode-symbol is sometimes used as a Flourish of approval in Dutch.

External links
List of proofreading marks

Copy editing